Ilocana Maiden , is a 1954 Filipino romantic comedy film produced by Sampaguita Pictures. The film is in black and white and was directed by Olive La Torre. It was also serialized over DZRH Sampaguita Radio Program. The movie also launched the career of Tita de Villa.

Background
Olive La Torre directed Gloria Romero as a spirited, cigar-chomping country girl who rolls tobacco leaves into cigars for a living. Romero is a wonderful comedian, combining as she does a stately beauty and aristocratic nose with eyes that slant just (and maddeningly) so, plus a sense of humor game enough to undercut her impeccable poise; Dolphy does well in a supporting role as comic sidekick with an insatiable appetite. The film, set in the tobacco-growing lands of the Ilocos region, is also a lengthy advertisement on the many pleasures of smoking, with seemingly everyone onscreen from the loftiest haciendero to the lowliest tobacco roller casually lighting up fearsome-looking cigars made from uncut tobacco leaf; one character actually suffers asthma attacks if he can't get his regular nicotine fix, from the tightly rolled cigars that only Romero knows how to make.

Cast
Gloria Romero
Ric Rodrigo
Dolphy
Tita de Villa
Francisco Cruz
Rudy Francisco
Marcela Garcia
Rebecca del Rio
Horacio Morales
Precy Ortega
Leleng Isla

Release
Ilocana Maiden was theatrically released in 1954. In late 2000, the film was aired on PTV as part of its SineGinto 2000 program in cooperation with the Advertising Foundation of the Philippines.

Accolades

References

External links

1954 films
1954 romantic comedy films
Films set in the Philippines
Philippine black-and-white films
Philippine propaganda films
Philippine romantic comedy films
Sampaguita Pictures films
Tagalog-language films